David Gerald Watson (born May 19, 1958 in Kirkland Lake, Ontario) is a Canadian retired professional ice hockey forward who played 18 games in the National Hockey League for the Colorado Rockies.

Career statistics

Regular season and playoffs

External links
 

1958 births
Living people
Canadian ice hockey forwards
Carolina Thunderbirds players
Colorado Rockies (NHL) draft picks
Colorado Rockies (NHL) players
Fort Worth Texans players
Ice hockey people from Ontario
Sault Ste. Marie Greyhounds players
Sportspeople from Kirkland Lake
Sudbury Wolves players